This page summarises the Australia national soccer team fixtures and results in 2001.

Summary
Australia started a busy 2001 with an away friendly in Bogota, Colombia where they went three goals behind to the hosts before pulling two back late. In April, Australia commenced their qualification for the 2002 FIFA World Cup by hosting a group of five in the OFC qualification First Round at Coffs Harbour. In the first game against Tonga, Australia set a new world record for an international football match when they won 22–0. Just two days later, they broke that record when they won 31–0 against American Samoa. Archie Thompson also set an individual world record by scoring 13 goals in the game. With Australia winning their next two games they comfortably proceeded to the OFC Final Round against New Zealand later in the year.

As champions of the 2000 OFC Nations Cup, Australia headed to South Korea for the 2001 FIFA Confederations Cup. They were drawn in a group with hosts South Korea; 1998 FIFA World Cup and UEFA Euro 2000 winners, France and Mexico, winners of the 1999 FIFA Confederations Cup. Australia beat Mexico in the opening game with a first half goal to Shaun Murphy and another to Josip Skoko in the second half. They then had a surprise victory over France when Clayton Zane scored the only goal of the game. Despite losing the third game 1–0 to South Korea, Australia finished second in the group on goal difference to proceed to the semi-final stage. They had to travel to Yokohama to play against Japan, the joint hosts, and lost the game 1–0. Australia finished off the tournament with another upset victory to claim third-place. This time it was against Brazil when Murphy scored in the 84th minute for a 1–0 victory.

Nine days later Australia were in Wellington for the first leg of the second round of World Cup qualification. Brett Emerton scored a double and despite a late Danny Tiatto red card they held on for a 2–0 win. The second leg was held in front of a crowd of 41,976 at Stadium Australia in Sydney and a 4–1 win gave them a 6–1 aggregate victory and meant Australia would proceed to OFC–CONMEBOL play-off against the fifth placed South American side. 

Heading back to Japan for an August friendly saw Australia lose 3–0 and in November they hosted the current world ranked number one nation, France in a friendly at the Melbourne Cricket Ground. Craig Moore gave Australia the lead just prior to half-time however French striker David Trezeguet equalised just after the break and the game finished 1–1.

The year finished up with a two-legged tie to attempt to qualify for the 2002 World Cup. Australia hadn't participated since the 1974 FIFA World Cup and they came up against Uruguay. The first leg was played in Melbourne and a Kevin Muscat penalty in the 78th minute gave Australia a 1–0 lead going into the second leg. On 25 November the second leg was played at Estadio Centenario in Montevideo. An early goal by Darío Silva for Uruguay brought the tie level however a second half brace by Richard Morales gave victory and World Cup qualification to Uruguay.

Record

Match results

Friendlies

Confederations Cup

World Cup qualifiers

Goal scorers

References

 Ozfootball.net Australian National Team Results 2001

2001
2001 in Australian soccer
2001 national football team results